Pınargözü or Pinargözü may refer to:

 Pınargözü Cave, in Isparta Province, the longest cave in Turkey
 Pınargözü, Aydıntepe, a village in Bayburt Province, Turkey